Bartolo da San Gimignano (1228 – 12 December 1300) - born Bartolo Buonpedoni - was an Italian Roman Catholic priest and a professed member from the Third Order of Saint Francis. Bartolo was born to nobles near Siena and fled home to become a priest to escape his father's wrath. He tended to poor people in the streets and used his income to provide alms to them and to alleviate their suffering while himself contracting a disease from working with the poor and succumbing to that same disease as a result.

His beatification received approval from Pope Pius X on 27 April 1910.

Life
Bartolo Buonpedoni was born in 1228 in San Gimignano - near Siena - as the last descendant from the noble house of the counts of Mucchio to Giovanni Buonpedoni and Giuntina. For two decades his childless mother begged God to give her a son and invoked the intercession of Saint Peter who appeared to her in a dream assuring her that she would soon have a son.

In his adolescence he felt called to become a priest despite the fact that his vain and proud father preferred that Bartolo instead become a knight and that he wed in order to continue the noble line. But his father became infuriated with Bartolo's inner desire and used all available means to break his son's resolve in a move that soon prompted Bartolo to flee his father's wrath and seek refuge with the Order of Saint Benedict at their convent of San Vito in Pisa. It was in that place that - as a secular worker - he worked in their infirmaries. The superiors there soon saw his eminent virtues and decided to offer him the habit and a place in their convent. But one night he had a vision in which Jesus Christ - with a scourge in His hand - said to him: "Bartolo, not in this habit are you to attain the celestial crown; it is to be through suffering and wounds, and in the garb of penance".

Bartolo instead requested admission into the Third Order of Saint Francis and decided to pursue his path to the priesthood where the Bishop of Volterra later ordained him as such. He then became an assistant priest at Picciola and twelve years later was made the pastor of another town not too far away where he aided the ill and the poor. One night he met a poor traveler and invited him to spend the night and at midnight heard a voice: "Bartolo, you have given hospitality to Jesus Christ!" He rushed back to the room where the traveler was lodging and found that he had vanished.

Around 1280 he contracted leprosy and resigned all of his parochial duties as a result while withdrawing to a leper hospital near his hometown of San Gimignano where he would spend the remainder of his life. In the hospital he celebrated frequent Mass for the patients.

One week before his death he had a vision in which Jesus Christ came to him and told him that he would soon die. He died from the disease on 12 December 1300 and his remains were interred in the church of Saint Augustine in San Gimignano. After his death a maid who tended to him before he died knelt before his open casket and wept. It was said that one hand of the dead priest reached for hers and clasped it for five hours to comfort her. Benedetto da Majano designed his tomb.

Beatification
The beatification process received papal approval from Pope Pius X on 27 April 1910 after his popular local 'cultus' - otherwise known as enduring veneration - was confirmed.

References

External links
Roman Catholic Saints

1228 births
1300 deaths
13th-century venerated Christians
13th-century Italian Roman Catholic priests
Beatifications by Pope Pius X
Deaths from leprosy
Franciscan beatified people
Italian beatified people
Italian Franciscans
Members of the Third Order of Saint Francis
People from Siena
Venerated Catholics